The Men's Bantamweight Weightlifting Event (– 56 kg) was the second lightest event at the weightlifting competition. Each weightlifter had three attempts for both the snatch and clean and jerk lifting methods. The total of the best successful lift of each method was used to determine the final rankings and medal winners. Competition took place on 30 July in the 4,500 capacity Albert Gersten Pavilion.

Results

References

Sources
 

Weightlifting at the 1984 Summer Olympics